Egon Jönsson (8 October 1921 – 19 March 2000) was a Swedish footballer who played as a midfielder for Malmö FF and the Sweden national team.

Club career
Nicknamed "Todde den Hemlige," Jönsson played 405 matches for Malmö FF, winning four Allsvenskan titles. He played in 200 Allsvenskan games for Malmö and scored 99 goals.

International career 
He was part of the Sweden squads that competed at the 1948 and 1952 Summer Olympics, as well as the 1950 FIFA World Cup, winning one gold medal and two bronze medals. He won a total of 22 caps, scoring 9 goals.

Coaching career 
After his active career he was a youth coach and part of the coaching staff for Malmö FF during the European Cup final against Nottingham Forest in 1979.

Honours 
Malmö FF
 Allsvenskan: 1943–44, 1948–49, 1949–50, 1950–51
Sweden
 FIFA World Cup third place: 1950
 Summer Olympics: 1948
 Summer Olympics third place: 1952
 Nordic Football Championship: 1948–1951
Individual

 Nordic Football Championship top scorer: 1948–1951

References 

1921 births
2000 deaths
Swedish footballers
Allsvenskan players
Malmö FF players
1950 FIFA World Cup players
Footballers from Malmö
Sweden international footballers
Olympic footballers of Sweden
Olympic gold medalists for Sweden
Olympic bronze medalists for Sweden
Footballers at the 1948 Summer Olympics
Footballers at the 1952 Summer Olympics
Olympic medalists in football
Medalists at the 1948 Summer Olympics
Association football midfielders